Nguyễn Văn Thắng (born 15 January 1990) is a Vietnamese footballer who plays as a defender for V.League 1 club Bình Định.

References 

1996 births
Living people
Vietnamese footballers
People from Nghệ An province
Association football defenders
V.League 1 players
Hoang Anh Gia Lai FC players
SHB Da Nang FC players